The 1988 Missouri gubernatorial election was held on November 8, 1988, and resulted in a victory for the Republican nominee, incumbent Governor John Ashcroft, over the Democratic candidate, State Representative Betty Cooper Hearnes, and Libertarian Mike Roberts.

Betty Hearnes was married to Warren E. Hearnes, who had served as governor from 1965 to 1973.

Results

References

Gubernatorial
1988
Missouri